Semyon Alesker (born 1972 in Moscow, Soviet Union) is an Israeli mathematician at Tel Aviv University. For his contributions in convex geometry and integral geometry, in particular his work on valuations, he won the EMS Prize in 2000, and the Erdős Prize in 2004.

References

External links

Website at Tel Aviv University

1972 births
Living people
Israeli mathematicians
Academic staff of Tel Aviv University
Erdős Prize recipients